Josef Pirrung (24 July 1949 – 11 February 2011) was a German football player.

Club career 
He spent twelve seasons in the Bundesliga with 1. FC Kaiserslautern.

International career 
Pirrung represented Germany in two UEFA Euro 1976 qualifiers against Greece and Malta.

Honours
 DFB-Pokal finalist: 1971–72, 1975–76, 1980–81

References

External links
 
 
 
 

1949 births
2011 deaths
German footballers
Germany international footballers
Germany B international footballers
Germany under-21 international footballers
1. FC Kaiserslautern players
Wormatia Worms players
Bundesliga players
2. Bundesliga players
Association football midfielders
20th-century German people
People from Südwestpfalz
Footballers from Rhineland-Palatinate
West German footballers